Artur-Aleksander Linari (also Artur-Aleksander Linholm; 12 January 1903 Tallinn – 25 October 1983 Toronto) was an Estonian politician, industrialist, mineralogist, mining engineer and professor. He was a member of Estonian National Assembly.

References

1903 births
1983 deaths
Estonian mineralogists
Academic staff of the Tallinn University of Technology
Members of the Estonian National Assembly
Estonian emigrants to Canada
Estonian World War II refugees
Oil shale researchers
Oil shale in Estonia
Politicians from Tallinn